Blepharomastix irroratalis is a moth in the family Crambidae. It was described by George Hampson in 1907. It is found in Guatemala.

The forewings are whitish, tinged and irrorated (speckled) with yellow brown, the costal area and terminal area suffused with brown. There are traces of a dark antemedial line and there is a slight dark discoidal lunule, as well as a faint, dark, postmedial, minutely waved line. There is a terminal series of slight dark points. The hindwings are tinged with ochreous and there is a faint dark discoidal lunule, as well as traces of a postmedial line and some slight dark points on the termen towards the apex.

References

Moths described in 1907
Blepharomastix